Gol Marzanik (also Romanized as Gol Marzanīk; also known as Gol Marzīnak) is a village in Akhtachi-ye Mahali Rural District, Simmineh District, Bukan County, West Azerbaijan Province, Iran. At the 2006 census, its population was 434, in 79 families.

References 

Populated places in Bukan County